Route 219 is a collector road approximately 20.3 km long  in the Canadian province of Nova Scotia.

It is located in Inverness County and connects Margaree Harbour at Trunk 30 (the Cabot Trail) with Dunvegan at Trunk 19.

The road is designated as part of the Ceilidh Trail.

Communities
Dunvegan
Rear Dunvegan
St. Rose 
Chimney Corner 
Margaree Harbour

See also
List of Nova Scotia provincial highways

References

External links
Google Map

Roads in Inverness County, Nova Scotia
Nova Scotia provincial highways